George Stanley (1907–2002) was a Canadian historian and designer of the Canadian flag.

George Stanley may also refer to:

George Stanley (15th century MP), Member of Parliament (MP) for Lancashire
George Stanley (poet) (born 1937), American-Canadian poet
George Stanley, 9th Baron Strange (1460–1503), English nobleman and statesman
George Douglas Stanley (1876–1954), Canadian politician and physician
George Stanley (British politician) (1872–1938), British soldier and politician
George Stanley (sculptor) (1903–1973), American sculptor and art teacher
George E. Stanley (1884–1949), British motorcyclist
George Stanley (footballer) (1909–1982), Australian rules footballer
George Edward Stanley (1942–2011), author of short stories